The Badminton event at the 2022 Mediterranean Games was held in Oued Tlélat, Oran Province, Algeria, from 26 to 30 June 2022.

Medal summary

Medalists

Medal table

References

External links
Official site
Results book

Sports at the 2022 Mediterranean Games
2022
Mediterranean Games
Badminton tournaments in Algeria